Horacio Duarte Olivares (born 5 November 1971) is a Mexican politician affiliated with the National Regeneration Movement (formerly to the Party of the Democratic Revolution). He served as Deputy of the LIX Legislature of the Mexican Congress as a plurinominal representative, and previously served in the Congress of the State of Mexico.

References

1971 births
Living people
Politicians from the State of Mexico
Members of the Chamber of Deputies (Mexico)
Party of the Democratic Revolution politicians
Morena (political party) politicians
National Autonomous University of Mexico alumni
Members of the Congress of the State of Mexico
Deputies of the LIX Legislature of Mexico